In computational complexity theory, a numeric algorithm runs in pseudo-polynomial time if its running time is a polynomial in the numeric value of the input (the largest integer present in the input)—but not necessarily in the length of the input (the number of bits required to represent it), which is the case for polynomial time algorithms.

In general, the numeric value of the input is exponential in the input length, which is why a pseudo-polynomial time algorithm does not necessarily run in polynomial time with respect to the input length.

An NP-complete problem with known pseudo-polynomial time algorithms is called weakly NP-complete.
An NP-complete problem is called strongly NP-complete if it is proven that it cannot be solved by a  pseudo-polynomial time algorithm unless . The strong/weak kinds of NP-hardness are defined analogously.

Examples

Primality testing
Consider the problem of testing whether a number n is prime, by naively checking whether no number in  divides  evenly.  This approach can take up to  divisions, which is sub-linear in the value of n but exponential in the length of n (which is about ).  For example, a number n slightly less than  would require up to approximately 100,000 divisions, even though the length of n is only 11 digits. Moreover one can easily write down an input (say, a 300-digit number) for which this algorithm is impractical. Since computational complexity measures difficulty with respect to the length of the (encoded) input, this naive algorithm is actually exponential. It is, however, pseudo-polynomial time.

Contrast this algorithm with a true polynomial numeric algorithm—say, the straightforward algorithm for addition:  Adding two 9-digit numbers takes around 9 simple steps, and in general the algorithm is truly linear in the length of the input.  Compared with the actual numbers being added (in the billions), the algorithm could be called "pseudo-logarithmic time", though such a term is not standard.  Thus, adding 300-digit numbers is not impractical.  Similarly, long division is quadratic: an m-digit number can be divided by a n-digit number in  steps (see Big O notation.)

In the case of primality, it turns out there is a different algorithm for testing whether n is prime (discovered in 2002) that runs in time .

Knapsack problem
In the knapsack problem, we are given  items with weight  and value , along with a maximum weight capacity of a knapsack .
The goal is to solve the following optimization problem; informally, what's the best way to fit the items into the knapsack to maximize value?
 maximize 
Solving this problem is NP-hard, so a polynomial time algorithm is impossible unless . However, an  time algorithm is possible using dynamic programming; since the number  only needs  bits to describe, this algorithm runs in pseudo-polynomial time.

Generalizing to non-numeric problems
Although the notion of pseudo-polynomial time is used almost exclusively for numeric problems, the concept can be generalized:
The function m is pseudo-polynomial if
m(n) is no greater than a polynomial function of the problem size n and an additional property of the input, k(n).  (Presumably, k is chosen to be something relevant to the problem.)
This makes numeric polynomial problems a special case by taking k to be the numeric value of the input.

The distinction between the value of a number and its length is one of encoding: if numeric inputs are always encoded in unary, then pseudo-polynomial would coincide with polynomial.

See also
 Strongly NP-complete
 Quasi-polynomial time

References

Analysis of algorithms
Complexity classes
Computational complexity theory
Pseudo-polynomial time algorithms